Eric Butorac (born May 22, 1981), nicknamed Booty, is an American retired professional tennis player. He was a doubles specialist, and for a period of approximately six years was the No. 3 ranked American doubles player. His best result was reaching the 2014 Australian Open finals with partner Raven Klaasen. Their run to the final included a victory over the World No. 1 team of Bob and Mike Bryan.

He attended Ball State University in Muncie, Indiana, where he played on the men's tennis team for one year before transferring to Gustavus Adolphus College in St. Peter, Minnesota, where he graduated in 2003.

Family

Butorac is of Croatian descent. Butorac's parents, Jan and Tim Butorac, are directors of the Rochester Tennis Connection (Indoor & Outdoor site) in Rochester, Minnesota. His  brother, Jeff, is a basketball coach at Century High School. Tim Butorac is a USPTA professional, teaching tennis at the Rochester Indoor Tennis Club during the winter and at the Kutzky/Rochester Outdoor Tennis Center during the summer months.

College career
Eric Butorac played at Ball State University for one year before transferring to Gustavus Adolphus College. He has a long history with Gustavus: his father played for coach Steve Wilkinson, and, at age five, Eric attended tennis camp with Wilkinson. He closed out his senior season of 2003 by winning both the NCAA Division III singles and doubles championships, with Kevin Whipple as his partner.

Recent activity

In 2014, Butorac started his year with reaching the final of the Australian Open. He then went on to win titles in Memphis and Stockholm. All of these were with partner Raven Klaasen.

In 2013, Butorac made it to the Round of 16 at the Australian Open and won the doubles title in Kuala Lumpur with Raven Klaasen.

In 2012, Butorac made the quarterfinals of the Australian Open and won the doubles title in São Paulo (with Bruno Soares).

In 2011, Butorac had his best season reaching a career-high ranking of no. 17, and finishing as the no. 9 team in the world with partner Jean-Julien Rojer of the Netherlands. They won three titles and made the semifinals of the Australian Open.

In 2010, Butorac paired with Rajeev Ram to make the quarterfinals of the Australian Open.  He also won titles in Chennai (with Ram), Tokyo and Stockholm (with Rojer). He was on the 2010 roster of the Boston Lobsters in the World Team Tennis pro league.

In April, May, and June 2009, Butorac and American Scott Lipsky won the Tallahassee Tennis Challenger, the Estoril Open in Portugal, and a tournament in Nottingham, England.

In early February 2007, the US-Scots pair claimed their first doubles title in a Challenger event in Dallas, and a week later they won their first ATP title at the SAP Open. They continued their winning run the following week when the unseeded pair defeated second seeds Julian Knowle and Jürgen Melzer, 7–5, 6–3, to capture the doubles title of the Regions Morgan Keegan Championships at the Racquet Club of Memphis.

In July 2006, Butorac and Jamie Murray reached their first ATP Tour doubles final, in Los Angeles, losing in straight sets to the Bryan brothers, who were the world's top-ranked doubles team.

Off court

In February 2022, Butorac was named Tournament Director of the Western & Southern Open. The Western & Southern Open features an ATP Masters 1000 as well as a WTA 1000 tournament in the same week at the same venue, making it one of five events to host concurrent top tier tour tournaments.

Butorac was the president of the ATP Player's Council. He succeeded Roger Federer as president (whom he served under as VP for the previous term). He was succeeded by Novak Djokovic on August 30 2016. 

Starting in 2010, Butorac has been the volunteer assistant coach at Harvard University. He is one of only three players from the NCAA Division III ranks to ever make a living on the tour.

In 2009 Butorac started the Minnesota Tennis Challenge, a charity event to benefit St. Paul Urban Tennis. Participants included Bob and Mike Bryan, Justin Gimelstob, Rajeev Ram, Melanie Oudin, and Somdev Devvarman. Butorac is a regular speaker at coaching conventions and USTA showcases around the country.

Major finals

Grand Slam finals

Doubles: 1 (runner-up)

ATP career finals

Doubles: 29 (18 titles, 11 runners-up)

Doubles performance timeline

''Current till 2016 US Open.

References

External links

 
 
 Eric Butorac's Minnesota Tennis Challenge

1981 births
Living people
American male tennis players
Ball State Cardinals men's tennis players
Gustavus Adolphus Golden Gusties men's tennis players
Sportspeople from Rochester, Minnesota
Tennis people from Minnesota
American people of Croatian descent